Guanshanhe Station, formerly known as Cicheng New City Station during construction, is an elevated subway station in Ningbo. The name of this station is because of neighbouring Shazigang (also named as Guanshanhe or Guanshan River), serving as Line 4 in Ningbo Rail Transit. Construction of this station began in 2015.

Style 
Guanshanhe Station is located in Cicheng connecting road, near Cishui East Street, Jiangbei District. The station is an elevated 3-story island platform station, with following characteristics: 120m lengths and 19m widths. The platform has widths in a range from 9.22m to 10m. The total construction area is 7702 sq meters.

Exits 
It has 3 exits.

References 

Ningbo Rail Transit stations
Railway stations in China opened in 2020